Ruandanyssus is a genus of mites in the family Rhinonyssidae. There are at least three described species in Ruandanyssus.

Species
These three species belong to the genus Ruandanyssus:
 Ruandanyssus artami Domrow, 1967
 Ruandanyssus strandmanni Sakakibara, 1968
 Ruandanyssus terpsiphonei Fain, 1957

References

Rhinonyssidae
Articles created by Qbugbot